Perebor is a rural locality (a village) and the administrative center of Pereborskoye Rural Settlement, Beryozovsky District, Perm Krai, Russia. The population was 516 as of 2010. There are 11 streets.

Geography 
Perebor is located on the Shakva River, 19 km north of  Beryozovka (the district's administrative centre) by road. Podperebor is the nearest rural locality.

References 

Rural localities in Beryozovsky District, Perm Krai